Karaula is a village in the municipality of Ilijaš, Bosnia and Herzegovina.

References

Populated places in Ilijaš